One on One is a contemporary Christian music album by Steve Camp and was released by Sparrow Records in 1986.

Track listing 
"Foolish Things" (Camp, Rob Frazier) – 4:01 
"The Other Side of the World" (Camp) – 4:36
"Judgment Begins with the House of God" (Camp) – 3:42
"One on One"; duet with Margaret Becker (Camp, Margaret Becker) – 4:32
"He Covers Me" (Camp, Frazier, John Rosasco) – 4:45
"Cheap Grace" (Camp, Becker, Phil Madeira) – 5:10
"Mr. Brokenhearted" (Camp, Frazier, Rosasco) – 4:51
"Threshing Floor" (Camp, Ashley Cleveland) – 4:53
"He's All You Need" (Camp, Frazier) – 5:04

Personnel 

 Steve Camp – lead and backing vocals, E-mu SP-12 programming
 Smitty Price – keyboards
 Dann Huff – lead guitar, rhythm guitars
 Michael Landau – rhythm guitars
 Leland Sklar – bass
 Jeff Porcaro – drums
 Daniel Greco – percussion
 Jon Clarke – English horn
 John Rosasco – orchestration
 Bob Carlisle – backing vocals
 Bill Champlin – backing vocals
 Tamara Champlin – backing vocals
 Tommy Funderburk – backing vocals
 Steve Lively – backing vocals
 Jason Scheff – backing vocals
 Margaret Becker – lead vocals (4)

Production

 Steve Camp – producer, arranger
 John Rosasco – producer, arranger
 Dennis MacKay – rhythm track engineer at Bill Schnee Studios and Weddington Studios, North Hollywood, California
 Dan Garcia – assistant engineer
 Peter Hayden – assistant engineer
 Mike Ross – assistant engineer
 David Schober – assistant engineer
 Bill Schnee – mixing at Bill Schnee Studios, North Hollywood, California
 Steve Hall – mastering at Future Disc, Hollywood, California
 Jim Shanman – lyric sheet design, box design 
 Stan Evenson – art direction, jacket design 
 Phil Fewsmith – photography

Notes
 "He's All You Need" was used in a scene during the 1999 film, The Moment After.

References 

1986 albums
Steve Camp albums